Julio Cardinal Rosales y Ras (September 18, 1906 – June 2, 1983), the second Archbishop of Cebu, was a Filipino cardinal of the Roman Catholic Church. A native of Calbayog, he made his studies at the Seminary of Calbayog and was ordained in his hometown on June 2, 1929. From 1929 to 1946, he did pastoral work in the diocese of Calbayog. He was consecrated bishop of Tagbilaran on September 21, 1946.

Archbishop of Cebu 

On December 17, 1949, Rosales was promoted to the metropolitan see of Cebu. During his reign, in 1965, Cebu hosted the celebrations for the 400th anniversary of the Christianization of the Philippines.

College of Cardinals 
Rosales was elevated to the college of cardinals by Pope Paul VI in the consistory of April 28, 1969 and given the titular church of Sacro Cuore di Gesù agonizzante a Vitinia. He also participated in both conclaves of 1978. He resigned the pastoral government of his archdiocese, on August 24, 1982 and died less than a year later in Cebu City, his beloved episcopal city.

Burial 
Julio Rosales is buried at the mausoleum of the Roman Catholic Metropolitan Cathedral in Cebu City, Cebu, Philippines. His mementos are currently on display at the Cathedral Museum of Cebu.

Family 
Julio Rosales was the brother of Philippine Senator Decoroso Rosales. The Senator named his grandson Julio Rosales II.

External links 

Catholic Hierarchy - Julio Cardinal Rosales y Ras †
 

 

1906 births
1983 deaths
Filipino cardinals
Filipino Roman Catholics
Participants in the Second Vatican Council
Cardinals created by Pope Paul VI
Roman Catholic bishops of Tagbilaran
People from Calbayog
Visayan people
Roman Catholic archbishops of Cebu
Presidents of the Catholic Bishops' Conference of the Philippines